The 46th Nizhnedneprovskaya Rocket Division was a division of the Soviet Strategic Rocket Forces, active from 1961–62 to 1992 under the Soviet Union, and from 1992 to 2002 as part of Ukraine. The division traced its history back to the 188th Rifle Division, formed in Kaunas in spring 1941. The division fought in the Battle of the Dnieper, for which it was awarded the honorific "Lower Dnieper". After the Second Jassy–Kishinev Offensive it garrisoned Sliven in Bulgaria. At some point it moved to Pervomaisk in Ukraine and became the 20th Rifle Division in 1955. In 1957, it became the 93rd Motor Rifle Division and was disbanded in 1959. In 1960, the 29th Rocket Brigade was formed in Pervomaisk and became the 46th Rocket Division in 1960. The 46th Rocket Division inherited the honors and awards of the 188th Rifle Division. After the dissolution of the Soviet Union, the division became part of Ukrainian military and was disbanded by 2002.

History

World War II 
The history of the 46th Rocket Division starts from April 29, 1941, when the formation of the 188th Rifle Division was completed in Kaunas.
With 29th Rifle Corps of 11th Army on 22.6.41. Fought in central Russia and the Ukraine. It was with the 82nd Rifle Corps of the 37th Army in Bulgaria in May 1945. The division played a part in the liberation of Ukraine and Moldova. The division's soldiers showed heroism and courage, and three soldiers were awarded the Hero of the Soviet Union, and more than 7000 were awarded military orders and medals.

For successful operations in the breakout through heavily fortified German defenses in the area north-east of the city of Krivoy Rog, the crossing of the Dnieper, and the liberation of the Lower Dnieper, the division on the order of the Supreme Commander on 17 February 1944 was awarded the honorary title "Nizhnedneprovskiy".

For exceptional Service to the Motherland in the Great Patriotic War, particularly distinguishing themselves in the battles for the liberation of Krivoi Rog, the division in February 1944 was awarded the Order of the Red Banner.

Cold War 
It became the 52nd Rifle Brigade postwar at Zaporizhia with the 82nd Rifle Corps in the summer of 1946. In October 1953, it was upgraded to a division again.

The division appears to trace its history through its 1955 redesignation as the 20th Rifle Division and later the 93rd Motor Rifle Division (1957–59). On 17 May 1957, it became the 93rd Motor Rifle Division, part of the 25th Army Corps. The division included the 11th, 27th and 38th Motor Rifle Regiments, the 352nd Tank Regiment and other units. The division disbanded on 1 March 1959.

In May 1960, the 29th Rocket Brigade was activated as part of the 43rd Rocket Army. It was commanded by Colonel Ivan Khomenko. In 1961, it was composed of the 62nd, 84th and 434th Missile Regiments. The 434th was stationed at Pervomaisk and equipped with R-14 Chusovaya theatre ballistic missiles. The 84th was at Simferopol and had R-5M missiles. The 62nd was at Balta and had SS-4 Sandal theater ballistic missiles.

The division became part of the Strategic Missile Forces in 1961. On April 29, 1961 on the basis of the 29th Rocket Brigade control (of  Pervomaisk) was formed the headquarters of the 46th missile, Nizhnedneprovskiy, Red Banner Division. In 1962, it inherited the awards and honorary titles of the 93rd MRD and thus became the "Nizhnedneprovskaya Red Banner" Division. 

In 1991 it comprised the 62nd, 309th, 83rd, 115th, 116th, 355th, 593rd, 546th, and 552nd Rocket Regiments. In the 1994–97 period all the regiments were first de-alerted, and then from 1997–2002, disbanded. Forty RS-22 missiles were removed from their silos; 30 silos were eliminated; storage facilities for the RS-22s were built at the 24th Arsenal GRAU (Military Unit Number 14247, A2365; Lviv-50 facility), p. Mykhaylenky, Zhytomyr region); warehouses at Pervomaisk were used for storage of the missiles; and 20 silos were remodelled.

Organization in 1941 
Structure in 1941:

 Headquarters
 523rd Rifle Regiment
 580th Rifle Regiment
 595th Rifle Regiment
 234th Light Artillery Regiment
 228th Howitzer Artillery Regiment
 9th Anti-Tank Battalion
 260th Reconnaissance Battalion
 352nd Engineer Battalion
 557th Signal Battalion
 25th Medical Battalion
 141st Supply Battalion
 18th Chemical Defense Company

References

Michael Holm 46th Missile Division

Rocket divisions of the Soviet Union
Divisions of Ukraine
Artillery units and formations of Ukraine
Military units and formations established in 1961
Military units and formations disestablished in 2002
Military units and formations awarded the Order of the Red Banner